Na'vi River Journey is a dark ride attraction at Disney's Animal Kingdom's Pandora – The World of Avatar. The ride takes guests through the Kasvapan River of Pandora from the 2009 film Avatar, showcasing native animals and bioluminescent flora, with inclusion of complex Audio-Animatronics.

The Na'vi Shaman animatronic seen towards the end of the ride is the most advanced animatronic ever created by Walt Disney Imagineering, boasting incredibly-realistic movement.

Summary

Queue 
The exterior queue winds through the exotic landscape of Pandora before leading into a covered queue which looks to have been constructed by the Na’vi and is filled with totems, signs describing the animals guests will encounter during the boat ride, and some woven artistic pieces.

Ride 
Boarding a hand-woven reed boat provided by Alpha Centauri Expeditions, guests journey down the Kaspavan River into the colorful bioluminiscent rainforest. After a Na'vi scout greets guests on the shore, the boat passes by viperwolves, hexapedes, woodsprites, panopyra, and fan lizards. After passing under leaves that creatures above are hopping between, the boats come across a Na'vi tribe and their direhorses walking to a ceremonial site. Passing by a waterfall, guests see the Shaman of Songs leading the Na'vi into a musical celebration of their bond with Ewya. After this encounter, the boats enter a cave with various offerings and return to the loading docks.

Soundtrack
During the ride, the Shaman of Songs sings lyrics written in the Na'vi language created by Dr. Paul Frommer for the 2009 film. Dr. Frommer posted the lyrics on his blog in 2017.

On January 4, 2019, the soundtrack for Na'vi River Journey was released by Walt Disney Records along with the other music featured in Pandora – The World of Avatar. Written by Simon Franglen and the late James Horner, the release credits Sandra Benton as the vocals for the Shaman of Songs and the Slovak National Symphony in Bratislava as the recording orchestra for the music.

References

External links

 

Pandora – The World of Avatar
Disney's Animal Kingdom
Walt Disney Parks and Resorts attractions
Amusement rides based on film franchises
Walt Disney Parks and Resorts gentle boat rides
Audio-Animatronic attractions
Amusement rides introduced in 2017
2017 establishments in Florida